Child's Place Developmentally Appropriate Program School, Inc. is a private school that offers pre-school, primary and secondary education. It is located at 453 National Rd. Calumpang, Binangonan, Rizal, Philippines

History
Developmentally Appropriate Practice

Developmentally appropriate practice is an approach to teaching grounded in the research on how young children develop and learn and in what is known about effective early education. Its framework is designed to promote young children's optimal learning and development, and involves teachers meeting young children where they are (by stage of development), both as individuals and as part of a group; and helping each child meet challenging and achievable learning goals. It is also a perspective within early childhood education whereby a teacher or child caregiver nurtures a child's social/emotional, physical, and cognitive development by basing all practices and decisions on:

(1) Theories of child development

(2) Individually identified strengths and needs of each child uncovered through authentic assessment

(3) The child's cultural background as defined by his community, family history, and family structure

Child's Place Developmentally Appropriate Program School was established to meet the needs of its clientele of offering a different approach in rearing their children. The school believes that it could give a wide variety of benefits to young children where they could find learning a truly enjoyable and challenging experience.

Branches

Philippines
Branches are located in Binangonan and Taytay

Myanmar
A branch is located in Yangon.

References

 http://www.naeyc.org/DAP

Schools in Rizal
Binangonan, Rizal